Brawn of the North is a lost 1922 American silent Northwoods film. It was produced by Laurence Trimble and Jane Murfin with release through Associated First National Pictures. The film stars Irene Rich and a new canine find by Trimble named Strongheart. This was the second film starring the dog after his introduction in The Silent Call (1921). The film is now considered lost.

Cast

 Irene Rich as Marion Wells
 Lee Shumway as Peter Coe
 Joseph Barrell as Howard Burton
 Roger James Manning as Lester Wells
 Philip Hubbard as The Missionary
 Jean Metcalfe as The Missionary's Wife
 Baby Evangeline Bryant as The Baby
 Lady Silver as The Vamp, a dog
Strongheart as Brawn

Gallery

See also
List of lost films

References

External links

Movie posters at North Woods Drama, Northeast Historic Film

1922 films
American silent feature films
Films directed by Laurence Trimble
First National Pictures films
Lost American films
American black-and-white films
Fictional dogs
1922 lost films
1920s American films